KCT may mean:

 Kansas City Terminal Railway, terminal railroad in the Kansas City metropolitan area
 Kaolin clotting time, a medical test used to detect lupus anticoagulant
 Kungchantang, the Wade–Giles spelling of the Communist Party of China
 Koggala Airport near Galle, Sri Lanka, IATA code
 King College of Technology in Namakkal, India
 Kumaraguru College of Technology in Coimbatore, India
 Korps Commandotroepen, Royal Netherlands Army specialist forces
 Kigali City Tower, the tallest building in Rwanda
 Knight Commander of Temple, a modern Knight of the Order of the Temple